PRiMA Aero Trasporti Italiani was an Italian airline founded in 2010, headquartered in Marghera, Venice. Its hub was Venice Marco Polo Airport (VCE). Formerly Eagles Airlines, it was the successor of Alpi Eagles, backed by a Sicilian investment company.

The company made its first flight on 24 August 2010 on the Venice – Lamezia Terme route, and subsequently also had flights to Catania, Reggio Calabria and Rome Fiumicino.

On 23 May 2011 a lawsuit against Eagles Airlines' use of the Eagles name was decided in favour of Alpi Eagles, as a result of which Eagles Airlines changed its name effective 27 May to PRiMA Aero Trasporti Italiani.

The company terminated operations on 4 November 2011.

Destinations

Europe
Italy
Bologna - Guglielmo Marconi Airport
Catania - Fontanarossa Airport

Terminated destinations
France: Nîmes, Paris-Charles de Gaulle
Germany: Berlin-Tegel
Greece: Athens
Italy: Crotone, Forlì, Lamezia Terme, Milan-Bergamo, Naples, Rome-Ciampino, Rome-Fiumicino, Venice
Macedonia: Skopje
Romania: Bucharest

Fleet

The PRiMA Aero Trasporti Italiani fleet included the following aircraft:

See also 
 List of defunct airlines of Italy

References

External links

Italian companies established in 2010
Italian companies disestablished in 2011
Defunct airlines of Italy
Airlines established in 2010
Airlines disestablished in 2011